100 Years may refer to:
"100 Years" (song), 2003 song by Five For Fighting
100 Years (film), film due to be released in 2115, one hundred years after production of the film

See also
Century
Year 100